Bourette is a shoddy silk fabric with bumps often blended with other yarns made of Bourette fibers. The name "Bourette"  is from its constituting fiber. It has a rough surface incorporating multicolored threads and knots of spun silk. The fabric is made with silk bourette and wool or cotton yarn. Bourette is a lightweight single cloth with a rough, knotty, and uneven surface.

Silk waste 
Silk waste has many copious names wherein Floss is a general name for silk waste. Other names are 'Schappe' or 'echappe.'

"Schapping" is a step of silk production of fermentation at low temperature for softening the gum. Schappe is one of the made products from Silk waste/Floss.

Bourette and Florette 
Silk waste consists of two types, Bourette and Florette. The bourette fibers are short in length compared to the 'Florette', which are long silk fibers, suitable for products such as combed or worsted materials.

Construction

Bourette yarn 
Bourette yarn is a coarse, irregular slubbed yarn type made of silk waste fiber created during silk processing.

Weave 
The fabric is a plain weave fabric but also possible with twill weave. The warp is made with wool or other types of yarns, and the weft is bourette. The yarn slubs provide a unique texture with small fancy colored lumps, scattered throughout.

Uses 
Bourette was used for dresses, and furnishing material.

References 

Woven fabrics
Silk